Cordelius Jamerr Parks (born November 12, 1986) is an American cornerback of Canadian football who is currently a free agent. He was picked up on waivers by the Seattle Seahawks on June 16, 2010. He was signed by the Rams as an undrafted free agent in 2009. He played college football at Northeastern.

Early years
Parks played four years of football at Stone Mountain High School in Stone Mountain, Georgia, where he was the team captain as a junior and senior. He earned Second-team All-County honors as a senior. In addition to being a running back and defensive back, he also ran track for three years, finishing Second in the 110-meter and First in the 300-meter hurdles at the county championship. Also competed and in the State Finals in the 110-meter and 300-Meter hurdles as well as the Triple-jump

College career
Parks, in 2008, started all 12 games at cornerback for Northeastern and made 54 tackles, forced a fumble, recovered a fumble and defensed four passes. In 2007, he started in 11 games at cornerback and was third on the team in tackles (63), first in interceptions (2) and deflected four passes. He also returned 20 kickoffs for a 21.0 yard average. As a sophomore in 2006, he totaled 40 tackles with four deflections and had a 22.0-yard average on 21 kickoff returns. In 2005, he played in 11 games, making 14 tackles.

Parks competed on the track team in 2005, 2006, and 2007 in the 100 meters, 110 hurdles, and the 4x100 relay, placing high in the CAA Championships.

Professional career

St. Louis Rams
Parks was signed by the St. Louis Rams as an undrafted free agent on April 29, 2009. He was promoted to the active roster after spending most of the season on the practice squad on December 26.

Seattle Seahawks
Parks Spent a Short time on the Seahawks Practice Roster in 2010 before being Released after week 5

Minnesota Vikings
Parks spent the 2010 season on the Vikings practice-squad. After being signed to their 2011 offseason roster, had an outstanding Preseason with the Vikings but was released due to injury after the final Preseason game.

New Orleans Saints
Parks participated in training camp with the New Orleans Saints and was cut on August 27, 2012.

BC Lions
Parks played for the BC Lions from 2013 to 2015.

Edmonton Eskimos
Parks signed with the Edmonton Eskimos on May 26, 2016.

References

External links
New Orleans Saints bio
Northeastern Huskies bio
BC Lions bio

1986 births
Living people
African-American players of American football
African-American players of Canadian football
American football cornerbacks
American football wide receivers
BC Lions players
Canadian football defensive backs
Edmonton Elks players
Minnesota Vikings players
New Orleans Saints players
Northeastern Huskies football players
People from Decatur, Georgia
People from Stone Mountain, Georgia
Players of American football from Georgia (U.S. state)
Sportspeople from DeKalb County, Georgia
St. Louis Rams players
Seattle Seahawks players
21st-century African-American sportspeople
20th-century African-American people